Sue Dwiggins Worsley (born Miriam Gretchen Sues; 1914–2011) was an American writer and production assistant on many films and also TV shows. She also worked on the memoir of her husband, film director Wallace Worsley Jr. She worked largely in science fiction and horror genres, but also did production secretary work for Deliverance.

Selected filmography 

 Monstrosity (1963)
 Indestructible Man (1956)

References 

1914 births
2011 deaths
American women television writers
American women screenwriters
American television writers
21st-century American women